"Come and take it" is a historic slogan, first used in 480 BC in the Battle of Thermopylae as "Molon labe" by Spartan King Leonidas I as a defiant answer and last stand to the surrender demanded by the Persian Army, and later in 1778 at Fort Morris in the Province of Georgia during the American Revolution, and in 1835 at the Battle of Gonzales during the Texas Revolution.

American Revolutionary War

Sunbury, Georgia, is now a ghost town, though in the past it was active as a port, located east of Hinesville, Georgia.  Fort Morris was constructed in Sunbury by the authority of the Continental Congress.  A contingent of British soldiers attempted to take the fort on November 25, 1778.  The American contingent at Fort Morris was led by Colonel John McIntosh (c. 1748–1826).  The Americans numbered only 127 Continental soldiers plus militiamen and local citizens. The fort itself was crudely constructed and could not have withstood any concerted attack.

The British commander, Colonel Fuser, demanded Fort Morris' surrender through a written note to the American rebels. Though clearly outnumbered (he had only about 200 men plus artillery), Colonel McIntosh's defiant written response to the British demand included the following line: "As to surrendering the fort, receive this laconic reply: COME AND TAKE IT!".  The British declined to attack, in large part due to their lack of intelligence regarding other forces in the area. Colonel Fuser believed a recent skirmish in the area, combined with Colonel McIntosh's bravado, might have reflected reinforcements and so the British withdrew.

The British returned in January 1779 with a larger force. They later conquered and controlled nearly all of Georgia for the next few years.  Col. McIntosh's defiance was one successful and heroic event which inspired the patriots as the War moved to the Carolinas and then north.

The Fort Morris Historical Marker is on Martin Road, Midway, Georgia. It is located at the visitor center for the Fort Morris Historic Site. The center is located off Fort Morris Road, at the end of the Colonels Island Highway (Georgia Route 38). The marker memorializes the battle and notes the "Come and Take It!" response.

In recognition of his valor of defending Fort Morris in Sunbury, McIntosh was awarded a sword by the Georgia Legislature with the words "Come and Take It" engraved on the blade.  McIntosh later served in the War of 1812 as an American General, still protecting the Georgia coast. He served honorably, receiving honors from the City of Savannah for his service.

Texas Revolution

In early January 1831, Green DeWitt wrote to Ramón Músquiz, the top political official of Bexar,  and requested armament for defense of the colony of Gonzales. This request was granted by supplying a Spanish made six-pounder bronze cannon on the condition it be returned when asked for, the colony also having a much smaller cast iron cannon of around one pounder calibre.  James Tumlinson, Jr. signed for receipt of the six-pounder cannon on March 10, 1831 in Bexar.

At the minor skirmish in 1835 known as the Battle of Gonzales—the first land battle of the Texas Revolution against Mexico—a small group of Texians successfully resisted the Mexican forces who had orders from Colonel Domingo de Ugartechea to seize the loaned cannon after the Texians had refused to return it when asked.  

As a symbol of defiance Caroline Zumwalt and Eveline DeWitt, young women from Gonzales, made a flag containing the phrase "come and take it" along with a black star and an image of the cannon that they had been loaned four years earlier by Mexican officials. This was the same message that was sent to the Mexican government when they told the Texians to comply with the loan condition and return the cannon; the Texian refusal to do so led to the Mexican attempt to regain the cannon using military force.

The original flag was lost shortly after the battle. Conjectural replicas of the original flag can be seen in the Texas State Capitol, the Bob Bullock Texas State History Museum, the Sam Houston State University CJ Center, the University of Texas at El Paso Library, the Marine Military Academy headquarters building, the Hockaday School Hoblitzelle Auditorium, and in Perkins Library at Duke University.

Adapted uses 

The first-known modified version, from the 1990s, replaces the cannon with an M16 rifle and was displayed at a Bill of Rights rally in Arizona following the announcement by President George H. W. Bush that certain types of firearms and firearms parts would be banned. It was shown at a number of later rallies and campaign events through the late 1990s, and now resides in a private collection.

In 2002, a version of the flag was created which depicted a Barrett .50 BMG Rifle.  Other versions have depicted various firearms, and even other objects dear to the hearts of the flag makers.  During the 2000 Stanley Cup Finals at least one Dallas Stars fan had created a replica of the flag with the Stanley Cup replacing the cannon; the Stars were the defending champions that year.

Rock musician Ted Nugent recorded and released a track in 2021 entitled "Come and Take It" for his 2022 album Detroit Muscle. Long known for his staunch advocacy of gun rights, the musician also sells autographed "Come and Take It" merchandise on his official website.

See also
 "La garde meurt mais ne se rend pas" and "Merde!" ("shit", figuratively "go to hell"), historic response of French General Pierre Cambronne to a request to surrender at the Battle of Waterloo (1815)
 "NUTS!", historic response to an offer of surrender from Nazi Germany at the Siege of Bastogne (1944)
 Reply of the Zaporozhian Cossacks, a painting by Ilya Repin depicting the legend of a defiant Cossack response to an Ottoman ultimatum
 "Je vous répondrai par la bouche de mes canons!" ("I will answer you with the mouths of my cannons"), shortened version of Frontenac's historic response at the Battle of Quebec (1690)
 "They shall not pass", historic phrase of military defiance from many encounters
 "Rússkiy voyénniy korábl, idí náhuy" ("Russian warship, go fuck yourself"), response, during the 2022 Russian invasion of Ukraine, by a Ukrainian border guard on Snake Island to demands from the Russian warship Moskva to surrender.

References

External links

 Gonzales Flag as designed in 1835
Detailed History of the Come And Take It flag. Includes the modernized versions.

American political catchphrases
Slogans
Quotations from military
Texas Revolution
Flags of the United States
1830s neologisms
Battle cries